Clube Atlético Mineiro is a Brazilian professional football club based in Belo Horizonte, Minas Gerais, Brazil. The club has played in the Brasileirão, the top tier of the Brazilian football league system, throughout all of its history with the exception of one season, as well as in all editions of the Campeonato Mineiro, the premier state league of Minas Gerais, while also taking part in numerous CONMEBOL-organised international competitions. This is a list of notable footballers who have played for Atlético Mineiro since its foundation as Athletico Mineiro Football Club in 1908.

João Leite holds Atlético Mineiro's official appearance record, with 684. Reinaldo is the club's all-time leading goalscorer with 255 goals since joining the club's first squad in 1973. Dadá Maravilha comes in second with 211, the only other player to score over 200 goals for the team. Lucas Pratto is Atlético's all-time foreign goalscorer with 19 goals.

The list comprises players who have achieved notability through making a major contribution to the club as a player, such as being club captain, founder member, winning individual awards while at the club or being part of major honour winning squads. For a list of all Atlético Mineiro players, major or minor, with a Wikipedia article, see :Category:Clube Atlético Mineiro players. For individual records (appearances and goalscorers) and individual recognitions see the statistics and records related article. For the current squad and its notable players, see the main Clube Atlético Mineiro article.

List of players 

Players are listed in alphabetical order according to the date of their first-team debut for the club. Appearances and goals include all matches for the club, substitute appearances included. A star denotes the player is included on the club's "Great Idols" list, according to its official website. Italics denote the player is currently at the club. International appearances are those at full international level, including substitutions.

References
General
Atlético Mineiro players:

Brazilian national team appearances:

Specific

 
Atletico Mineiro
Players
Association football player non-biographical articles